Edward D. Roberts (July 18, 1864 – August 4, 1920) was an American Republican politician. Born in Cambria, Wisconsin, Roberts served as California State Treasurer, 1911–1915. He died in San Bernardino, California.

Notes

1864 births
1920 deaths
Politicians from San Bernardino, California
People from Cambria, Wisconsin
State treasurers of California
California Republicans